Lưu or Luu without diacritics is a Vietnamese surname. It is also the Vietnamese and Khmer transliteration of the Chinese surname Liu (劉). 
During the Three Kingdoms era (3rd century AD), a number of  Luu/Liu (劉) families immigrated to Vietnam. During the Shu Han dynasty, for example, Emperor Liu (Luu) Bei's descendants left their capital Chengdu in Sichuan. After losing the Cao Wei dynasty, many royals and peasants alike headed south and eventually escaped to Vietnam.

During the Yuan dynasty (1279-1368), Yao people who included the surname Liu (劉) and H'mong-Mien Lìu,  migrated from Guangdong, Guangxi to Vietnam to escape pressure from invading Mongols and ethnic Chinese. Yet from the same period, Mongols also used the surname Liu in Vietnam. Vietnam has endured centuries of constant occupation throughout history. With the Vietnamese people's resistance to various regimes, Luu took on a new specific meaning synonymous to war spikes, sharpened bamboo traps more commonly known as punji sticks. These the Vietnamese people would construct and employ to combat unsuspecting enemy forces moving through the jungle landscape--most famously documented in the Vietnam War.
According to folk-story "Hùng Vương Ngọc Phả" (Family tree of Hung King) one of 50 sons of Kinh Dương Vương there was Lưu Lang, who joined with Mother Âu Cơ and settled to northern mountain Duyen Hung area of Van Lang. Luu Lang is considered the ancestor of all 12 Vietnamese/Kinh people who possessed the surname Luu. In another folktale "Sự tích trầu cau", a legend about areca nuts and betel leaves, a landlord with the surname Luu is mentioned. The offering of areca nuts and betel leaves to the ancestors is a Vietnamese wedding ritual. It's also an ancient legendary story only.

Another major immigration period is in 1949 when the communist took over China and many loyal nationalists of the Republic of China left for Vietnam. Prior to the French occupation, Vietnamese writing was in Chinese characters and Luu was written as 劉.  After the French occupation, alphabets were introduced and Liu (劉) surnames were spelt as Luu. In 1919, the French government abandoned the use of Chữ Hán and forced the Vietnamese to strictly use Portuguese's alphabet spelling system. Many descendants of Luu who speak Chinese would spell Luu in English and write 劉 as their Chinese surname.

Notable people with the surname Lưu
 Luu Co (chữ Hán: 劉基), one of "four important people" under Đinh Dynasty of Emperor Đinh Bộ Lĩnh. Lưu Cơ was the first mayor of Đại La city (modern Hanoi) nominated directly by Đinh Tiên Hoàng after Vietnam regained independence from China.
 Lưu Văn Lợi, lawyer, former chief of Department for Border Department of SRV Government.
 Lưu Quang Vũ, Vietnamese playwright, poet and writer
 Đinh Xuân Lưu, Vietnamese Ambassador to Poland and Israel
 Janette Luu, Vietnamese-American broadcaster
 Lưu Hữu Phước, Vietnamese composer
 Lưu Huỳnh, Vietnamese American film director
 Luu Meng, Chinese Cambodian chef, culinary author and hospitality entrepreneur
 Lưu Trọng Lư, Vietnamese poet, writer, play writer
 Thang Luu, Vietnamese American professional poker

Vietnamese-language surnames